Cynipini is a tribe of gall wasps. These insects induce galls in plants of the beech and oak family, Fagaceae. They are known commonly as the oak gall wasps.
It is the largest cynipid tribe, with about 936 to 1000 recognized species, most of which are associated with oaks. The tribe is mainly native to the Holarctic.
Cynipini wasps can act as ecosystem engineers. Their galls can become hosts of inquilines, and the wasps themselves are hosts to parasitoids. 

Most of these wasps undergo cyclical parthenogenesis, sometimes reproducing sexually, and sometimes producing young without fertilization.

Genera

 Acraspis
 Amphibolips
 Andricus
 Antron
 Aphelonyx
 Atrusca
 Barucynips
 Bassettia 
 Belonocnema
 Biorhiza
Burnettweldia
 Callirhytis
 Cerroneuroterus
 Chilaspis
 Coffeikokkos 
 Cyclocynips
 Cycloneuroterus
 Cynips
Disholandricus
 Disholcaspis
Dros
Druon
 Dryocosmus
Erythres
 Eumayria
 Eumayriella
Femuros
Grahamstoneia
 Heteroecus
Heocynips
 Holocynips
 Kinseyella
Kokocynips
Latuspina
 Loxaulus
 Melikaiella
 Neuroterus
Nichollsiella
 Odontocynips
Paracraspis
 Philonix
 Phylloteras
 Plagiotrochus
 Prokius
 Protobalandricus
 Pseudoneuroterus
Sphaeroteras
Striatoandricus
 Trichagalma
 Trichoteras
Trigonaspis
Xanthoteras
 Zapatella
 Zopheroteras

References

Cynipidae

Hymenoptera tribes